Mariusz Wodzicki (born 1956) is a Polish mathematician, whose works primarily focus on analysis, algebraic k-theory, noncommutative geometry, and algebraic geometry.

Wodzicki was born in Bytom, Poland in 1956. He received a MSc from Moscow State University in 1980, and he completed his doctoral degree in 1984 at the Steklov Institute of Mathematics in Moscow under the advisement of Yuri Manin (Spectral Asymmetry and Zeta-Functions). 
In 1985–1986 he was a research assistant at the Mathematical Institute, University of Oxford, after which he became an assistant professor at the Mathematical Institute of the Polish Academy of Sciences. He is currently a professor of mathematics at the University of California, Berkeley.

In 1992, Wodzicki was an invited speaker of the European Congress of Mathematics in Paris (Algebraic K-theory and functional analysis). In 1994, he was an invited speaker of the International Congress of Mathematicians in Zürich (The algebra of functional analysis).

Selection of writings

Vestigia investiganda. Moscow Mathematical Journal, vol 2, 2002, pp. 769–798, 806. 
with Ken Dykema, Gary Weiss: Unitarily invariant trace extensions beyond the trace class. In: Complex analysis and related topics (Cuernavaca, 1996) Oper. Theory Adv. Appl. vol. 114, 2000, pp. 59–65
Algebraic K-theory and functional analysis, ECM Paris 1992, Birkhäuser, Progress in Mathematics, 1994

References 

https://math.berkeley.edu/~wodzicki/Lubar.html

Living people
Polish mathematicians
Steklov Institute of Mathematics alumni
University of California, Berkeley faculty
Functional analysts
Polish expatriates in the United States
1956 births
People from Bytom
Moscow State University alumni